The Yazva (Russian: Я́зьва; Komi: Ёдз, Yodz) is a river in Perm Krai, Russia. It is a left tributary of the Vishera. It flows through the south part of the Krasnovishersky District and enters the Vishera downstream of the town of Krasnovishersk,  from its confluence with the Kama. 
Traditionally, Komi-Yazva, a Finno-Ugric language, has been spoken in the river basin.

Tributaries 
The main tributaries of the Yazva are, from source to mouth:
Left: Molmys, Mel, Glukhaya Vilva, Kolynva
Right: Kolchim

References

Rivers of Perm Krai